The Iraqi M80 Helmet is a military helmet made of compressed canvas used by the Iraqi Armed Forces from the early 1980s onwards. They were used in the Iran–Iraq War, the Persian Gulf War/Operation Desert Storm, and the 2003 Invasion of Iraq/Operation Iraqi Freedom. These helmets were originally manufactured and designed in South Korea by Hyundai Heavy Department or H.H. Didizian, both are South Korean companies, but in 1990 an Iraqi-made version appeared, which is usually fitted with a distinctive rubber rim. Both types of helmet are still in limited service with the Iraqi Security Forces but are being replaced by the American PASGT helmet.

History
Before the 1980s the Iraqi Armed Forces had used various steel helmets which were mostly of Soviet origin. These included Soviet SSH40 and SSH68 helmets and Polish M50 patterns. During the early 1980s the M80 helmet began to replace these patterns. These new helmets were of a lightweight composite construction undoubtedly inexpensive to purchase from their South Korean manufacturers, at a time when the Iraqi economy was severely stretched by the war with Iran.

Design

Clearly drawing inspiration from the American M1 Helmet which had first appeared during World War II, it differed significantly in being constructed from compressed layers of fabric coated in plastic. This inevitably offered troops a much lower degree of ballistic protection than a steel helmet, or modern composite helmet such as the PASGT. The M80's liner is a direct copy of the Riddell liner seen on American M1 helmets made after 1972 and used a US type T1 chinstrap. The helmets were supplied painted dark green, this was often overpainted in a desert tan colour which has a tendency to rub off, revealing the original colour underneath. They also have a tendency to fray at the edges, showing the layers of fabric used in their construction.

In 1990 an Iraqi-made version of this helmet, the M90, appeared which was of inferior quality construction. These later helmets are prone to splitting at the edges and have a protective rubber rim. The post 1990 helmets were supplied in desert tan colour only. Both types of helmet can be found with a variety of Arabic and military unit markings, and are sometimes painted white with red markings for the Iraqi Military Police. Iraqi helmets were abandoned in large numbers on the battlefields of Iraq and Kuwait and proved to be popular souvenirs with western soldiers returning home from the Persian Gulf.

See also
 Iraqi M90 helmet

References
 Brayley, Martin, Tin Hats to Composite Helmets, A Collector's Guide. 2008.

External links

 M80 helmet at world-war-helmets.com

Combat helmets of Iraq
Military equipment introduced in the 1980s